The Uhrenmuseum Beyer (Beyer Watch and Clock Museum) is located in the heart of the city of Zürich, Switzerland and is one of the world's leading private museums dedicated to horology.

The museum is located on the lower level of Bahnhofstrasse 31, the main shopping boulevard. It is affiliated with Chronometrie Beyer, a high grade watch retailer run by the same family for generations.

The core of the museum was acquired during the life of Theodore 'Teddy' Beyer, a pioneer in collecting antique timekeepers.  The collection is made up of premechanical timekeepers (sundials, sandglasses, water and fire clocks) as well as clocks and watches from around the world and covering all eras.

The collection is particularly strong regarding early clocks and watches, including several pieces from the gothic and renaissance era, as well as complicated pieces with many complications.

Many of the displayed pieces are unique and/or significant in the history of watchmaking, and therefore are often loaned out to major museums around the world. The collection includes one of the early marine chronometers by Ferdinand Berthoud, a pendule sympathique by Breguet, a pocket watch with astronomical indications by Auch, several bespoke late 20th century watches by George Daniels, one of the few reproductions of the astrarium by De Dondi to name just a few highlights.  Furthermore, there are superb Geneva made enameled pocket watches, and a most instructive timeline illustrating the history of the Neuchâtel pendule.

Additionally there is a good small display of locally made clocks and watches including such Zurich makers as Bachoffner, Liechti and Ochsner.

See also
Horology
Similar museums:
Deutsches Uhrenmuseum
National Watch and Clock Museum
Mussee Internationale d'Horlogerie
Clockmakers' Museum
Royal Observatory, Greenwich

References
Beyer, Theodore (author): The Museum of Time Measurement Beyer Zurich, Verlag Calley, Munich, 1982, 
Beyer, Rene (au & Meiss, Reinhard (authors): Uhrenmuseum Beyer Zurich, Antike Uhren, Neuerwerbungen, Verlag Calley, Munich, 1982,

External links
 Uhrenmusem Beyer, Zurich 

Horological museums in Switzerland
Museums in Zürich